The 2014 Continental Indoor Football League season was the Continental Indoor Football League's ninth overall season. The regular season started on Monday February 3, with the Northern Kentucky River Monsters visiting the Bluegrass Warhorses at the Alltech Arena, and ended with the 2014 CIFL Championship Game, the league's championship game held on May 18.

The Erie Explosion successfully defended their championship from the previous year with a win over the Marion Blue Racers in the championship.

Teams
The Kane County Dawgs, Kentucky Drillers and Owensboro Rage folded either during or after the 2013 season. The addition of the Bluegrass Warhorses, Chicago Slaughter, Kentucky Xtreme and the Northern Kentucky River Monsters prompted the league to make North and South Divisions for the 2014 season. The Slaughter folded in January, so the Chicago Blitz franchise was formed to take their place in 2014.

The Detroit Thunder, Kentucky Xtreme, Bluegrass Warhorses and Port Huron Patriots all ceased operations during the 2014 season.

Schedule
For the 2013 season there was a 10-game, 14-week regular season running from February to May. Each team hosted 5 games, and had five away games.

Regular season standings

Playoffs

Coaching changes

Pre-season

Midseason

Awards

Regular season awards

1st Team All-CIFL

2nd Team All-CIFL

References

External links
 CIFL website